Yaaku may refer to:
the Yaaku people
the Yaaku language